Controller is the third studio album by metalcore band Misery Signals and was released July 22, 2008. The album was recorded by producer Devin Townsend who produced Misery Signals' debut record Of Malice, and the Magnum Heart.

On April 28, 2008, Misery Signals posted their first single for Controller called "Weight of the World". Bassist, Kyle Johnson said "It was the first song we recorded for the new album and it's a different song for us, it's little angrier, faster and actually the shortest song clocking in at a little over two minutes."

Vocalist Karl Schubach goes onto say "It was the first song we tracked and Devin Townsend (Producer) had me run through the entire song once just to get down the idea of where I wanted to go. He told me that I nailed it right off the bat and we ended up keeping most of it as the finished version. The song itself is about deciding whether you should tell someone what you really think and get it off of your chest or take the high road and let them think that they are right. That situation can really blow up."

Recently they have filmed a video for their track "A Certain Death" which will serve as the first single off Controller. The video was directed by renowned music video director David Brodsky and starred Brandon Slagle in the narrative portions of the video.

Some 2,900 copies were sold in the first week of release. According to several sources, the album could have exceeded the limit of 20,000 copies sold.

Track listing

Personnel 
Misery Signals
Karl Schubach - lead vocals
Ryan Morgan - lead guitar, backing vocals
Stuart Ross - rhythm guitar
Kyle Johnson - bass
Branden Morgan - drums

Additional personnel
Produced by Devin Townsend
Drum engineering by Dean Maher
Drum editing by Mike Young
Additional percussion by Richard Morgan
Artwork by Sons of Nero

References 

2008 albums
Misery Signals albums
Albums with cover art by Sons of Nero
Albums produced by Devin Townsend